Franz Steindachner (11 November 1834 in Vienna – 10 December 1919 in Vienna) was an Austrian zoologist, ichthyologist, and herpetologist. He published over 200 papers on fishes and over 50 papers on reptiles and amphibians. Steindachner described hundreds of new species of fish and dozens of new amphibians and reptiles. At least seven species of reptile have been named after him.

Work and career
Being interested in natural history, Steindachner took up the study of fossil fishes on the recommendation of his friend Eduard Suess (1831–1914). In 1860 he was appointed to the position of director of the fish collection at the Naturhistorisches Museum, a position which had remained vacant since the death of Johann Jakob Heckel (1790–1857).

Steindachner's reputation as an ichthyologist grew, and in 1868 he was invited by Louis Agassiz (1807–1873) to accept a position at the Museum of Comparative Zoology at Harvard University. Steindachner took part in the Hassler Expedition of 1871–1872 (a journey that circumnavigated South America from Boston to San Francisco). In 1874 he returned to Vienna, and in 1887 was appointed director of the zoological department of the Naturhistorisches Museum. In 1898 he was promoted to director of the museum.

He traveled extensively during his career, his research trips taking him throughout the Iberian Peninsula, the Red Sea, the Canary Islands, Senegal, Latin America, et al. In his zoological studies, his interests were mainly from a systematic and faunistic standpoint.

Among his better known works in ichthyology are Ichthyologische Notizen (1863, published over 8 editions), Ichthyologische Beiträge (1874), and Beiträge zur Kenntniss der Flussfische Sudamerikas (1879), the latter work dealing with river fish of South America. In the field of herpetology, he published Die schlangen und eidechsen der Galapagos-inseln (Snakes and lizards of the Galapagos Islands, 1875).

From 1875, he was member of the Vienna Academy of Sciences. In 1892 he became a member of the German Academy of Sciences Leopoldina.

Eponymy
A number of taxa have been named from Steindachner's collections after him:

Fish genera
 Steindachneria, a fish genus of the western Atlantic; (Steindachneria argentea, commonly known as the luminous hake).
 Steindachneridion, a genus of fish in South America discovered by Steindachner, is named after him.
 Steindachnerina, a genus of fish in South America.
Fish species
 Leptagoniates steindachneri, an Amazon river fish
 Istiblennius steindachneri, a combtooth blennie from the Western Indian Ocean  
 Nosferatu steindachneri, a Mexican Cichlid
 Bario steindachneri, a characin from Peru and Brazil
 Taractichthys steindachneri, a pomfret  
 Synodontis steindachneri from Africa, an upside down catfish
 Trachydoras steindachneri, a thorny catfish from the Amazon
 Labeobarbus steindachneri, a barb from the Cameroons
 Phoxinus steindachneri, from north east Asian
 Raiamas steindachneri, a cyprinid
 Rhinoptera steindachneri, the Golden Cownosed ray
 Cathorops steindachneri, Steindachner's sea catfish
 Gymnothorax steindachneri, a Brown Speckled Morey eel
 Gnathocharax steindachneri, a characin from the Amazon and Orinoco
 Geophagus steindachneri  the Redhump Eartheater
 Luciobarbus steindachneri, a cichlid from Northeast South America, the Iberian peninsula
 Ophioblennius steindachneri,  a blennie from the  Eastern Pacific
 Cynoscion steindachneri, a drum
 Hypoptopoma steindachneri, a Loricariid 
 Haemulon steindachneri, a chere-chere grunt
 Umbrina steindachneri, a drumand
 Hypomasticus steindachneri, a south American Headstander

Reptile species
 Amphisbaena steindachneri, a worm lizard from South America
 Chelodina steindachneri,  a long necked turtle from Australia
 Lucasium steindachneri, a gecko from Australia
 Kinosternon steindachneri, a Florida mud turtle 
 Lioscincus steindachneri, a skink from New Caledonia
 Micrurus steindachneri, a snake
 Palea steindachneri, a softshell turtle from China and Southeast Asia,
 Phrynocephalus steindachneri, a lizard (synonym of Phrynocephalus przewalskii),
 Pseudalsophis steindachneri, a Galapagos snake

Bird species and subspecies
 Speckle-chested piculet, Picumnus steindachneri
 Australasian pipit, Anthus novaeseelandiae steindachner from the Antipodes Islands.

Amphibian species
 Hyperolius steindachneri from Africa
 Sclerophrys steindachneri, a toad found throughout sub tropical Africa

Invertebrates
 Aphonopelma steindachneri, a spider from the area of Southern California to Baja California.
 Bombus steindachneri, a Mexican bumblebee
 Neduba steindachneri, a katydid
 Stenomax steindachneri, a beetle
 Copiopteryx steindachneri, a moth
 Onchidella steindachneri, a sea slug
 Abralia steindachneri, a squid
 Ceratothoa steindachneri, a fish parasite

See also
 :Category:Taxa named by Franz Steindachner

References

Further reading
 Pietschmann V (1919). "Franz Steindachner ". Annalen des Naturhistorischen Museums in Wien 33: 47–48. (in German).

External links
 "The Herpetological Collection". Naturhistorisches Museum Wien. (in English).
 A selection of literature by Franz Steindachner: 
 Biography in German @ Österreichisches Biographisches Lexikon 1815–1950 (ÖBL ).

19th-century Austrian zoologists
Austrian taxonomists
1834 births
1919 deaths
Austrian herpetologists
Austrian ichthyologists
Austro-Hungarian scientists
Harvard University staff
Scientists from Vienna

20th-century Austrian zoologists